Padungan National Secondary School , formerly Lumba Kuda National Secondary School, is a co-ed public secondary school situated in Kuching, the capital of the East Malaysia state of Sarawak. It offers classes from Transition up to Form 5.

Administration

History 
Previously known as SMK Lumba Kuda, the school is small in size compared to other schools. 

National secondary schools in Malaysia
Secondary schools in Sarawak
1970 establishments in Malaysia